This is a list of standardized tests that students may need to take for admissions to various colleges or universities. Tests of language proficiency are excluded here.

Only tests not included within a certain secondary schooling curriculum are listed. Therefore, those tests initially focused on secondary–school–leaving, e.g., GCE A–Levels in the UK, or French Baccalaureate, are not listed here, although they function as the de facto admission tests in those countries (see list of secondary school leaving certificates).

Undergraduate

Albania
 Matura Shtetërore – Required for entry to some Albanian universities.

Australia
ATAR – Australian Tertiary Admission Rank, indicative rank for school leavers, replacing UAI, ENTE and TER and OP. Different states and territories have different external standardised tests.
 New South Wales: Higher School Certificate (HSC)
 Victoria: Victorian Certificate of Education (VCE)
 Queensland: Queensland Certificate of Education (QCE), Queensland Certificate of Individual Achievement (QCIA)
 South Australia: South Australian Certificate of Education (SACE)
 Western Australia: Western Australian Certificate of Education (WACE)
 Tasmania: Tasmanian Certificate of Education (TCE)
 ACT: No external standardised exams
 Northern Territory: Northern Territory Certificate of Education and Training (NTCET)
STAT – Special Tertiary Admissions Test, aptitude test for non–school leavers.
UCAT – University Clinical Aptitude Test, required for undergraduate entry to many Australian and New Zealand undergraduate-entry medical and dental schools.
GAMSAT – Graduate Australian Medical School Admissions Test, required for graduate entry to many Australian graduate–entry medical and dental schools.
International Student Admissions Test

Bangladesh
University Admission Test – Undergraduate level admission test. Each University has its own admission test.
Medical Admission Test – Undergraduate level medical Admission Test. It is a national level entrance examination.

Belize
 Caribbean Examinations Council.

Brazil
Vestibular – Single University entrance exam in Brazil, each University may have its own vestibular.
Exame Nacional do Ensino Médio

Burma
University Entrance Examination

Canada
 GED – High School Diploma Equivalent
 CAEL – Canadian Academic English Language Assessment
 Diploma Exams — Only taken in Alberta

Chile
 Prueba de Acceso a la Educación Superior (PAES) from 2022 (formerly PDT and PSU)

China
National College Entrance Examination – Standard means of entry to Chinese universities.

Colombia
SABER 11 Exam – Test for all undergraduate students that want to apply to a university in Colombian territory.

Cuba
Prueba de Ingreso a la Universidad – Set of exams in different subject matters for all students who want to enter any university in Cuba.

France
Baccalauréat (or Bac) – Test for all undergraduate students who are looking to enter a university in France.

Germany
Abitur – Test for German students who want to apply to a university.

Greece
 Panhellenic Examinations – Subject tests for Greek students and adults who want to enter to High Education Institutions (HEIs).

Hong Kong
Admission processes differ in institutes. For secondary school students applying for degree–level programmes provided by the University Grants Committee (UGC)–funded institutes, they can only apply through the Joint University Programmes Admissions System (JUPAS), which uses Hong Kong Advanced Level Examination (HKALE) and Hong Kong Certificate of Education Examination (HKCEE) as benchmark agency until academic year 2011/12, and Hong Kong Diploma of Secondary Education (HKDSE) since 2011/12.

JUPAS is not used in most non-UGC/non–degree level programmes, even these institutes still use the examination results that JUPAS uses as benchmark agency.

Hong Kong Certificate of Education Examination (Last year of exam in 2011, as EAS Subsystem of JUPAS until 2011).
Hong Kong Advanced Level Examination (Last year of exam in 2013, as JUPAS benchmark until 20/12 admission).
Hong Kong Diploma of Secondary Education (The new qualification to replace the two qualifications above, starts since 2011/12).

Hungary
From 2020 all students who would like to apply for a university in Hungary will have to prove their language skills. They are required to pass a nationally accredited language exam at B2 CEFR level.
 The European Language Certificates (language exam)
 Budapest University of Technology and Economics (language exam)

Érettségi (Matura)is the national school leaving exam, where school leavers take exams in 5 or more subjects, among which Hungarian Grammar and Literature, Maths, History and one foreign language is cumpolsory and at least 1 other subject has to be chosen.

Érettségi is divided into 2 levels. Most universities require at least one subject to be taken at Higher Level. From 2020 onwards, students wishing to enter into higher education will be required to have 1 subject taken at Higher Level.

India
Admission procedures and entry tests vary widely across states and universities/institutes. Usually, admission to a university in a state is based upon the performance of the candidates in the statewide Higher Secondary Examinations. These are usually given after completion of the twelfth standard/grade, for example, the HSC examinations of Maharashtra. Admission into federally established institutes like the Indian Institutes of Technology and the National Institutes of Technology is usually based on a combination of performance in nationwide exams such as the Joint Entrance Examination and the state–level Higher Secondary examinations. Admission to the National Law Universities is based on a national level entrance examination conducted annually by the CLAT.

National level

Professional courses entrance examinations 

 Joint Entrance Examination – Main (JEE-Main) – Standard means of entry to the National Institutes of Technology.
 Joint Entrance Examination – Advanced (JEE-Advanced) – Standard exams for entry to the Indian Institutes of Technology.
 Common Law Admission Test (CLAT) – Standard means of entry to the National Law Universities across India.
 National Eligibility cum Entrance Test (Undergraduate) (NEET (UG)) – For entry in to undergraduate medical education MBBS, The test is conducted at all India level.
 Common University Entrance Test (CUET) – For entry into the 45 Central Universities of India.

Other entrance examinations 

Joint Admission Test for M.Sc. – Joint Admission Test for M.Sc. is a national level entrance exam. Graduates can complete their M.Sc. or Master's from India's reputed institutes like IITs and IISc through JAM.
JEST – Joint screening test for graduates or postgraduates who wish to pursue their master's studies or research in the field of science.

Indonesia
State–level
SBMPTN – (Seleksi Bersama Masuk Perguruan Tinggi Negeri) A competitive test for undergraduate admissions in public universities in Indonesia.
SNMPTN – (Seleksi Nasional Masuk Perguruan Tinggi Negeri)

Conducted jointly by some universities
UMB – Ujian Masuk Bersama – Test for undergraduate admissions in some state and private colleges.
SBM–PTAIN – Test for entering public Islamic universities in Indonesia.
SBMPTMU – Test for entering Muhammadiyah universities.

By universities
UTUL UGM – Gadjah Mada University entrance exam.
SIMAK UI – University of Indonesia entrance exam.
USM Unsri – The admission test conducted by Universitas Sriwijaya.

Israel
Psychometric Entrance Test (colloquially "The Psychometry") – Required for undergraduate entry to most universities in Israel.

Iran
Iranian University Entrance Exam (Konkoor/Concours) – Standard means of entry to universities in Iran.

Ireland
Health Professions Admissions Test (HPAT) – Undergraduate Medical Admissions Test, required for undergraduate entry to Irish Medical Schools.

Japan
National Center Test for University Admissions
Examination for Japanese University Admission (EJU) – Required for entry by foreigners into many Japanese universities.
Japan University Examination (JPUE) – An alternative to EJU.

Malaysia
Sijil Pelajaran Malaysia, also known as Malaysia Certificate of Education.
Sijil Tinggi Persekolahan Malaysia, also known as Malaysia Higher School Certificate.

Mexico
Each University in Mexico has its own admission procedures. Some of them might use the EXANI–I from Centro Nacional de Evaluación para la Educación Superior "CENEVAL" (National Center for Higher Education Assessment). Many also use the Prueba de Aptitud Académica offered by the College Board Puerto Rico y America Latina.  However, due to the autonomous nature of most universities in Mexico, many universities use admissions tests that they develop themselves.

"Examen de admisión al Nivel Superior del Instituto Politécnico Nacional" (Admission Exam to the Higher Level of the National Polytechnic Institute).
"Examen Nacional de Ingreso a la Educación Media Superior" (National Entrance Exam to the Upper–Intermediate Education) also known as EXANI–I.
"Acuerdo 286 Bachillerato" (286 Baccalaureate Agreement), also known as ACREDITA–BACH. High School Diploma Equivalent.
"Examen General de Egreso de la Licenciatura" (General Egress Exam of the bachelor's degree). also known as EGEL.
"Examen para Profesionales Técnicos en Enfermería" (Exam for Nursing Technical Professionals), also known as EGEPT–ENFER.
"Examen General de Conocimientos y Habilidades para la Acreditación de la Licenciatura en Enseñanza del Inglés" (General Knowledge and Skills Test for the Accreditation of the English Teaching bachelor's degree), also known as EGAL–EIN.

Nepal
Common Management Admission Test (CMAT) – a standardized test taken by colleges to take admissions for BBA and BBM.

Medical Education Common Entrance Examination (MECEE) – a common entrance examination conducted in Nepal for providing admission in Medical UG and PG courses.

Netherlands
Eindexamen – also known as centraal examen (central exam) – a standardized test taken by Dutch students in conclusion of their high school education (voortgezet onderwijs; "continued education").

Nigeria
Unified Tertiary Matriculation Examination (UTME) – Mandatory computer–based test for all candidates (including non-Nigerians) applying to study into any Nigerian university. It is administered by the Joint Admissions and Matriculation Board.

Pakistan
NAT-I/II – National Aptitude Test, for admission in most universities and colleges of Pakistan.

It is conducted by the National Testing Service.
NMDCAT– National Medical and Dental College Admission Test, for admission in public and private sector medical and dental colleges and universities in Pakistan.

It is conducted by the Pakistan Medical Commission through National Testing Service.
ECAT – Engineering College Admission Test, for admission in public sector engineering college or university in Punjab, Pakistan.

It is conducted by the University of Engineering and Technology, Lahore.

ETEA (UET) - for admission in public sector engineering college or university in Khyber Pakhtunkhwa.

It is conducted by University of Engineering and Technology, Peshawar.

HAT-UG – HEC Aptitude Test-Undergraduate, for admission in selected government and private colleges and universities.
LAT – HEC Law admission Test, for LLB admission in all colleges and universities.
It is conducted by the Higher Education Commission of Pakistan.
Pre-Admission Tests - for admission in engineering universities of Sindh such as MUET and NED. 
The tests are conducted separately by the respective universities.

Poland
Universities and other institutions of higher education formerly ran their own entrance exams. Since the introduction of the "new matura" in 2005, and in particular the marking of that exam by independent examiners rather than by teachers at students' own schools, the matura now serves as the admission test for Polish students.

Russia 
 Unified State Exam – every student must pass after graduation from school to enter a university or a professional college. Since 2009, EGE is the only form of graduation examinations in schools and the main form of preliminary examinations in universities.
 Unified Republic Exam  (БРИ, BRI) – students which graduate in the Republic of Tatarstan can choose to pass the ERE/BRI in the Tatar language. The test is not obligatory and accepted as an entry exam only by the Tatarstan universities, especially for the Tatar language faculties.

Saudi Arabia 
 Qudurat and Tahseeli – by The National Center for Assessment in Higher Education AKA Qiyas.

Singapore 
Singapore–Cambridge GCE Advanced Level

Spain 
Pruebas de Acceso a Estudios Universitarios – Formerly called "Selectividad".

Sri Lanka 
GCE Advanced Level in Sri Lanka

In Sri Lanka, A-Level is offered by governmental and non-governmental schools. The qualifications are awarded upon successful completion of examinations called Local A-Levels while most of the private schools award them upon London A-Levels. Local GCE Advanced Level qualification is offered by the Department of Examinations. Passing A-Levels is the major requirement for applying for local universities.
This exam is very competitive, where students have to study college 1st-year and 2nd-year material and pass it to get college admissions. The tough nature of the examination is due to the government funding all the college students. Students who get in to a National University through the Advanced Level Examination are not required to pay college fees.

Sweden
Högskoleprovet – the Swedish Scholastic Aptitude Test.
PIL – Test and interview, used by the Karolinska Institute for admission to some of its study programmes.

Switzerland 
 EMS Swiss Admission Test for Medicine (Eignungstest für das Medizinsudium in der Schweiz).

Somalia 

 Certification Exams - (Somali: Imtixaanka Shahaadiga) Standard means of entry to Somali universities.

South Korea
College Scholastic Ability Test – Standard means of entry to South Korean universities and colleges.

Taiwan
General Scholastic Ability Test – Standard means of entry to Taiwanese universities and colleges held in January. It consists of five subjects, namely Chinese, English, Mathematics, Social Studies and Science. Examinees should take at least four subjects at a time (of course they can choose the whole set.)
Advanced Subjects Test – Standard means of entry to Taiwanese universities and colleges held in July. It consists of ten subjects, namely Chinese, English, Mathematics (A and B), History, Geography, Citizen and Society, Physics, Chemistry, and Biology. Examinees can take the tests that are required to meet to university's standard.

Turkey
TYT (first step of YKS) First and basic step for entry to Turkish universities. Consists the following subjects: Turkish, Mathematics (A level), Physics, Chemistry, Biology, History, Geography, Philosophy, Religion (or added philosophy questions)
AYT (second step of YKS) Second and more advanced test for entry to Turkish universities. Examinees have to choose their domain and complete the specific tests that their aimed university requires them to. Test types are the following: advanced maths, advanced science(physics, chemistry, biology), social sciences-1(Turkish language and literature, history, geography) social sciences-2(history, geography, philosophy, sociology, psychology, logic, religion(or added philosophy questions)) different language exams (English, German, French, Russian, Arabic)
YÖS – The Examination for Foreign Students for Higher Education Programs in Turkey

Ukraine
 External independent evaluation – Test for all undergraduate students who are looking to enter a university in Ukraine.

United Kingdom

Most applicants to universities in the UK take national examinations such as A-levels or Scottish Highers. Separate admissions tests are used by a small number of universities for specific subjects (particularly Law, Mathematics and Medicine, and courses at Oxford and Cambridge), many of these administered by Cambridge University's Admissions Testing Service.

Law
Cambridge Law Test.
LNAT – National Admissions Test for Law (Bristol, Durham, Glasgow, King's College London, Nottingham, Oxford, SOAS, UCL).

Mathematics
MAT – Mathematics Admissions Test (Oxford, Imperial College).
STEP – Sixth Term Examination Paper in Mathematics (Cambridge, Warwick).
Test of Mathematics for University Admission (LSE, Bath, Durham, Lancaster).

Medicine
BMAT – Biomedical Admissions Test (Brighton and Sussex Medical School, Imperial College, Keele, Lancaster, UCL, Cambridge, Leeds, Oxford).
GAMSAT – Graduate Medical School Admissions Test (Cardiff; Exeter; Keele; Liverpool; Nottingham; Plymouth; St George's, University of London; Swansea).
HPAT – Health Professions Admissions Test, currently only in use for admission into Medicine in the University of Ulster.
UCAT – United Kingdom Clinical Aptitude Test (Aberdeen; Birmingham; Bristol; Cardiff; Dundee; East Anglia; Edinburgh; Exeter; Glasgow; Hull York Medical School; Keele; King's College London; Leicester; Liverpool; Manchester; Newcastle; Nottingham; Plymouth; Queen Mary, University of London; Queen's, Belfast; Sheffield; Southampton; St Andrews, St George's, University of London; Warwick).

Other
CAT – Classics Admissions Test (Oxford).
ELAT – English Literature Admissions Test (Oxford, Cambridge). 
GAA – Geography Admissions Assessment (Cambridge) 
HAT – History Aptitude Test (Oxford). 
PAT – Physics Aptitude Test (Oxford).
MLAT – Modern Languages Admissions Tests (Oxford).
MML – Modern and Medieval Languages Test; provided and required by the Faculty of Modern & Medieval Languages of the University of Cambridge.
OLAT – Oriental Languages Admissions Test (Oxford). 
TSA – Thinking Skills Assessment (Oxford, Cambridge, UCL).
University of Oxford Philosophy Test.

United States

SAT – formerly Scholastic Aptitude Test, now Scholastic Assessment Test.
SAT Subject Tests (discontinued in 2021)
ACT – formerly American College Testing Program or American College Test.
Advanced Placement (AP).
CLT – Classic Learning Test.
THEA – Texas Higher Education Assessment.
GED – HSE or High School Diploma Equivalent; GED, HiSET or TASC brand of tests, depending on the State.
PERT – Replaced Accuplacer as the standard college placement test in Florida.

Vietnam
TSĐH–CĐ – Tuyển Sinh Đại Học – Cao Đẳng (University – College Selection Examination) until 2014.
THPTQG – Kỳ thi THPT Quốc gia (National High School Examination) since 2015.
TNTHPT - Kỳ thi tốt nghiệp THPT (High School Graduation Examination) since 2020

Postgraduate/Professional schools

Australia
GAMSAT – Graduate Australian Medical Schools Admissions Test.
LSAT – Law School Admission Test (some Juris Doctor programs).
IELTS (academic) – International English Language Test (for international students).

Bangladesh 
Postgraduate Admission Test – Each university in Bangladesh applies a different methodology to admit prospective Masters students. But usually, they have to appear in the Masters/Postgraduate Admission Test (different subject have different names). Some universities do not require any admission test.

However, no admission test is required for Ph.D. studies.

Brazil
ANPEC – Admission test for Postgraduate studies in Economics.
ANPAD – Admission test for Postgraduate studies in Business Administration.
POSCOMP – Admission test for Postgraduate studies in Computer Science.

China
Postgraduate Admission Test – Admission test for all graduate schools in mainland China. Subjects may vary.

Colombia
ECAES – Examen de Estado de Calidad de la Educación Superior.

India
 Business Admissions Test – Used by ISB for admissions to their Postgraduate Programme in Management for Family Businesses.
Joint Entrance Examination – Main – For entry in National Institutes of Technology, Government Funded Technical Institutes, Indian Institutes of Information Technology & Indian Institutes of Engineering Science and Technology to pursue various undergraduate engineering, technical and architecture courses.
Joint Entrance Examination – Advanced – For entry in Indian Institutes of Technologyto pursue various undergraduate engineering, technical and architecture courses.
 CSIR-UGC NET – All India test for entrance into Science Ph.D. programs and for eligibility to teach at undergraduate level across India. Having qualification as a lectureship from CSIR-UGC NET is compulsory for teaching across Indian colleges and universities at undergraduate and postgraduate level.
 CBSE-UGC NET – Entrance examination for Ph.D. in humanities and languages across India.
 Common Admission Test (CAT) – For entry to the management programs at Indian Institutes of Management (IIMs) and various other business schools in India.
 Graduate Aptitude Test in Engineering (GATE), Joint Admission Test to M.Sc. (JAM) and Joint Management Entrance Test (JMET) – Standard means of entry to various graduate courses at Indian Institute of Science (IISc) and the Indian Institutes of Technology (IITs).
 Management Aptitude Test (MAT) – For admission to Master of Business Administration, Master of Management Studies, etc. programs.
 XLRI Admission Test (XAT) – For admission to the management program at Xavier Labour Relations Institute.
 Graduate Pharmacy Aptitude Test (GPAT) – For entry to the master programs in the pharmacy.
 National Institute of Pharmaceutical Education and Research (NIPER) – For entry to seven institutes of the Indian government.
 JEST – JEST EXAM which have two phases of examination where the first phase is objective and second phase is subjective, by getting ranked in this test the student can be admitted into affiliated universities and institutes across India, for Physics and Computer Science Ph.D. programs.
 CLAT - PG - CLAT PG is entrance test for entry in LLM course to national law Universities in India.
Telangana State Integrated Common Entrance Test (TS ICET) -  is a state level entrance exam for the candidates clearing the exam will be eligible to get an admission into MBA (Master of Business Administration) and MCA courses with in Telangana state.
Andhra Pradesh Integrated Common Entrance Test (AP ICET) - is a state level entrance exam for the candidates to pursue MBA, M.Sc. and MCA courses with in the Andhra Pradesh State.

Mexico
Each University in Mexico has its own admission procedures. The official tests can be different, depending on the university the student wishes to enter. However, many major universities in the country use the PAA.

UNAM uses its own test for the COMIPEMS selectivity contest for bachelors. They also have their own autonomous selectivity contest for undergraduate and graduate degree students, which has its own exam for each study field.

Pakistan
GAT-General –  Graduate Assessment Test, for admission in M.S./M.Phil. programs.
GAT-Subject – Graduate Assessment Test, for admission in Ph.D. programs.

Turkey
 TUS – Graduate Medical Schools Admissions Test.
ALES – Academic Personnel and Postgraduate Education Entrance Examination.

United States and Canada
Miller Analogies Test (MAT)
Graduate Record Examination (GRE)
Graduate Management Admission Test (GMAT)
Medical College Admission Test (MCAT)
Dental Admission Test (DAT) (United States)
Dental Aptitude Test (DAT) (Canada)
Optometry Admission Test (OAT)
Pharmacy College Admission Test (PCAT)
Test of Essential Academic Skills (TEAS)
Veterinary College Admission Test (VCAT) (Has not been offered since April 2003)
Allied Health Professions Admission Test (AHPAT)
Law School Admission Test (LSAT)

See also
List of primary and secondary school tests
List of secondary school leaving qualifications
List of language proficiency tests

References 

School examinations
Admission tests
Standardized tests
Admission tests to colleges and universities
Tests